Ricky Megee (born 1970/1971) is an Australian, most notable for having been stranded in the Outback and surviving for 71 days in 2006. Megee later gave contradictory statements as to how he came to be stranded crossing the Northern Territory and Western Australia. On one occasion he said that his car broke down, and on another that he had been carjacked by an armed gang. However, a doctor later confirmed that Megee's appearance was consistent with having lived in extreme conditions. Like most deserts, the Tanami can reach  during the day but still be very cold at night. Megee made his own primitive shelters and survived by drinking rainwater and eating small animals and available vegetation for nourishment. He was eventually discovered by a group of station hands near Katherine, Northern Territory, and taken to Darwin for medical assistance. Although some doubts were later raised as to the exact chain of events as Megee related them, the police did not find evidence that a criminal offence had occurred.

Early life

Ricky Megee was born in 1970 or 1971 in Gippsland, Victoria; he later described his childhood as a happy one, until the family moved to Melbourne, where his father later killed himself. Megee worked at a variety of jobs. He was, variously, a carpet salesman, prawn fisherman, nightclub doorman, and an electrician. He eventually became a bailiff. Eventually, he went to jail after being involved in a fight in Perth, as well as for drug offences. In 2006 he was 35 years old and living in Queensland.

Journey to Port Hedland and attack

In January 2006 Megee had been offered work in  a government department in Port Hedland, Western Australia. He accepted the job, and set off on the long drive, which he had made multiple times before. Driving a 2001 Mitsubishi Challenger he took the Buntine Highway, which for much of his journey was a desert track across the outback of the Northern Territory.

The events leading to Megee being stranded are somewhat confused, and indeed, Megee's version of how events unfolded changed significantly over time. He first told his rescuers that his car had broken down, but then, The Washington Post reported, he claimed "that he had been drugged by hitchhikers and left for dead". Megee later elaborated on how this scenario unfolded, saying he had picked up a lone Aboriginal hitchhiker between the towns of Kalkaringi and Halls Creek. He believed that at some point the hitchhiker drugged Megee's drink. Megee said that although he normally always opened his own drinks from the car refrigerator, on this occasion he allowed his passenger to open one for him.

Later, in his 2010 autobiography, Megee said that there had been three men sitting on the roadside, who had run out of petrol, and that he had offered to give one of them a lift to a petrol station. Megee also posited that he could have been stabbed with a drugged-syringe during a struggle. Either way, Megee later recalled feeling increasingly "dazed and confused", and then blacked out before he recovered consciousness hours later. He also said that his attackers did not leave him immediately: they over-powered and stunned him. He later awoke in their camp. They had a gun, wrote Megee, but never used it; they did bring him water. After an unknown period, the carjackers lifted camp and disappeared. Before they left, they stole his shoes, but left him with $12.30 which had been in his pocket.

When he regained consciousness, he said, he was in a hole, covered in black plastic, which had had "some rocks and dirt thrown on top". Megee suggested that it was only the attempts by four dingoes to claw him that woke him up.

Journey across the desert

Megee walked for ten days through the northeastern fringe of the Tanami Desert. He often lost consciousness through heat exhaustion, as temperatures regularly went above . According to Mark Clifford, a local man who later witnessed Megee's arrival, although the temperatures were high, it was also the middle of the wet season during the time, which was in Megee's favour. When combined with the abundance of small wild animals and Megee's "hardy constitution", his chances of survival were, with hindsight, actually relatively good. However, it was never clearly established precisely how Megee became as lost as he did.

Megee said that he survived by eating leeches, insects, snakes, ants and lizards, and edible plants. He drank water from "various dams and waterholes" and scavenged in the bush every evening, eating "only one meal a day, just enough to stay alive". When water was unavailable, he drank his urine after chilling it to suppress the flavour.

Megee—"baked in the day and frozen at night"—created temporary shelters from the sun out of old branches, and eventually found a decrepit windmill. Megee said that he made "a little humpy out of a feed trough that was at some cattle yards, obviously a mustering point, I thought to myself, so I've dragged it up on top of the dam, flipped it over and dug a hole and just lived in there for 10 weeks." Megee became dangerously weak, to the extent that he was unable to travel as far on his daily foraging expeditions. At one point he suffered an abscess of the tooth that—weakened as he was—could have been fatal, and which he prised out of his mouth with his car keys.

Rescue and recovery

His rescuers were local station hands and their trainees, known as jackaroos. By now, Megee was starving, sunburnt, and suffering from malnutrition and exposure. Birrindudu Station manager, Mark Clifford, described Megee as "just a walking skeleton" when he was brought to the station, and said that the area he was found in was one of the "most isolated places in Australia".

On 5 April 2006 Megee was flown to the Royal Darwin Hospital, where medical staff described him as "emaciated, but...well hydrated". While in Darwin Hospital, Megee was interviewed by Northern Territory police, although they dismissed suggestions that there was any question of criminal activity on Megee's part. Indeed, they said they were unable to find any evidence of criminality at all, or even Megee's stolen car. Megee discharged himself from hospital after six days.

Aftermath

The Sydney Morning Herald subsequently suggested that there were "some doubts"  over elements of Megee's account, and reported that Megee was attempting to sell his story to "a commercial television station". It was also reported that the police, too, initially "had doubts about the story because of Megee's previous minor drug convictions". Megee refuted allegations that his account was in any way misleading and even offered to appear live on television and eat frogs to prove he was telling the truth. ABC Radio reported that Megee had told his story to them for free—although only after trying, unsuccessfully, to persuade the station to match a A$15,000 offer he said he had received from elsewhere. The doctor who treated Megee in Darwin commented that it was "very difficult to either deny or validate" his story, as he had responded so well to the treatment provided by dieticians, nutritionists and physicians.

Bush Tucker Man Les Hiddins—considered an expert on outback survival—acknowledged that Megee's survival was not as surprising as might have been thought. It was possible, he said, to survive in the bush for up to three years, and that "there are some areas where it's difficult to survive, and others where you can". For example, the area where Megee was, Hiddins described as "dry country which is, you know, that's pretty severe country in there". Other survival experts credit Megee's survival on his "instinctively solving the basic requirements of water, food and shelter—and adopting a survival mindset that pulled him through".

Megee subsequently wrote a book on his experience and emigrated to Dubai to work in construction.

See also
 Mauro Prosperi

Note

References

Bibliography 

 
 
 
 
 
 
 
 
 
 
 
 
 
 
 
 

Living people
1970s births
Survivalists
Australian writers
People from Victoria (Australia)